Tsentralnyi Stadium is a multi-use stadium in Bokhtar, Tajikistan.  It is used mostly for football matches and serves as the home of FC Khatlon and Tajik Telecom Qurghonteppa, both of the Tajik League. The stadium has a capacity of 10,000 people.

Football venues in Tajikistan